Niels de Langen (born 30 November 1998) is a Dutch para-alpine skier. He won two medals in alpine skiing at the 2022 Winter Paralympics.

Early life 

De Langen was born in 1998 in Arnhem, Netherlands. In the first year of his life he lost his right leg due to meningococcal disease. At 16 years of age, in June 2015, he made the decision to amputate his left leg which was also damaged as a result of the infection.

Career 

He won a bronze medal at the 2017 World Para Alpine Skiing Championships at the slalom event.

He represented the Netherlands at the 2018 Winter Paralympics and competed in all five disciplines: the Men's downhill, Men's Super-G, Men's super combined, Men's giant slalom and Men's slalom events.

In 2019, he won a silver medal at the World Para Alpine Skiing Championships in the giant slalom event. In 2022, he won the bronze medal in the men's sitting super combined event at the 2021 World Para Snow Sports Championships. He also won the bronze medal in the men's sitting slalom event.

He represented the Netherlands at the 2022 Winter Paralympics. He won the silver medal in the men's slalom and the bronze medal in the men's super combined sitting events. De Langen was the flagbearer for the Netherlands during the closing ceremony of the 2022 Winter Paralympics.

He won the bronze medal in the men's sitting giant slalom event at the 2023 World Para Alpine Skiing Championships held in Lleida, Spain.

Personal life 

He studies physiotherapy.

References

External links 

 
 

1998 births
Living people
Dutch male alpine skiers
Sportspeople from Arnhem
Paralympic alpine skiers of the Netherlands
Alpine skiers at the 2018 Winter Paralympics
Alpine skiers at the 2022 Winter Paralympics
Medalists at the 2022 Winter Paralympics
Paralympic medalists in alpine skiing
Paralympic silver medalists for the Netherlands
Paralympic bronze medalists for the Netherlands
21st-century Dutch people